Sos Hayrapetyan (also Airapetian, born 12 September 1959) is a retired field hockey defender from Armenia. He won four Soviet Cups (1982, 1983, 1986, 1987), eight Soviet championships (1980–1987), two European Cups (1982, 1983) and one Intercontinental Cup (1981), and medaled at the 1980 Summer Olympics and 1983 European Championship. Hayrapetyan was named an Honoured Master of Sports of the USSR in 1984. His son Levon is an association football player.

Biography
Hayrapetyan first trained in football and took up field hockey only in 1976. Within a few years, he had grown into one of the leading Soviet players. He started his club career in 1978 with SKA Sverdlovsk. In 1978 and 1979, he placed second at the Soviet championships, and in 1980 won the title. From 1981 to 1987, he played for Dynamo Alma-Ata and from 1988 to 1992 for Hrazdan.

From 1978 to 1991, Hayrapetyan was part of the Soviet national team. He won an Olympic bronze medal in 1980, the Intercontinental Cup in 1981, and a silver medal at the 1983 European Championships, losing the final in the penalty shootout. Soviet Union boycotted the 1984 Summer Olympics, and Hayrapetyan competed at the Friendship Games instead, where the Soviet team came in first place. All team members were awarded the title of Honored Master of Sports for their victory. Hayrapetyan later competed in the 1988 and 1992 Summer Olympics and finished seventh and tenth, respectively.

In 1992, Hayrapetyan moved to the German city of Hamburg, and from 1992 to 2004 played for Uhlenhorster HC. In 2004, after winning silver medals at the club championship in Germany, he retired and became a field hockey coach. He also helped in training his son, the national player of the Armenia national football team Levon Hayrapetyan.

References

External links
 

 databaseOlympics.com
 Dynamo Stellar Gallery 

1959 births
Living people
Armenian male field hockey players
Soviet male field hockey players
Olympic field hockey players of the Soviet Union
Field hockey players at the 1980 Summer Olympics
Field hockey players at the 1988 Summer Olympics
Field hockey players at the 1992 Summer Olympics
Olympic bronze medalists for the Soviet Union
Olympic medalists in field hockey
Soviet Armenians
German people of Armenian descent
Sportspeople from Yerevan
Honoured Masters of Sport of the USSR
Medalists at the 1980 Summer Olympics
Uhlenhorster HC players